Meghann Kay Burke (born October 11, 1980) is an American professional soccer goalkeeper. She was most recently a player and coach for Women's Premier Soccer League club Asheville City SC.    She currently serves as the Executive Director of the National Women’s Soccer League Players Association.   She led the NWSLPA to sign their first ever CBA in 2022.

College career
Burke attended Mehlville High School and was named Metro Goalkeeper of the Year in 1998. She was part of the United States U16 team in 1996–97. In four years at Saint Louis University Burke was a first-team starter and was named to various select teams. She also acquired the nickname "the Burkeinator" and was declared the University's Player of the Decade.

Club career
Since 2000 Burke has featured for a number of W-League and WPSL teams.

She played for Bristol Rovers in 2004–05, helping the English club reach the semi-finals of the FA Women's Cup.

Professional
After graduating from SLU, Burke was drafted by Carolina Courage of the WUSA. She returned to the professional ranks as a development player with Chicago Red Stars in 2010, before joining Sky Blue FC as a free agent in August 2010.

References

External links
 Meghann Burke at WPS
 Meghann Burke at Saint Louis Billikens

Expatriate footballers in England
Women's United Soccer Association players
Bristol Academy W.F.C. players
1980 births
Living people
Saint Louis Billikens women's soccer players
American women's soccer players
Soccer players from St. Louis
Women's association football goalkeepers
Player-coaches
Lawyers from St. Louis
Women's Professional Soccer players
Boston Renegades players
USL W-League (1995–2015) players